Estrela Clube Primeiro de Maio, usually known simply as Primeiro de Maio or 1º de Maio, is a football (soccer) club from Benguela, Angola. The club was the result of a merger from two clubs: Estrela Vermelha de Benguela and Grupo Desportivo 1º de Maio being then named África Têxtil 1º de Maio de Benguela due to its then major sponsor, a Benguela-based textile factory called África Têxtil. Shortly afterwards, the name was changed to its present denomination. In its golden years, in the 1980s, the club has won two Angolan leagues (1983 and 1985), three Angolan cups (1982, 1983 and 2007) and one Angolan supercup (1985). Moreover, Primeiro de Maio became in 1994, the first Angolan club to reach the final of a CAF competition and to win the Angola Cup and the Angola Super Cup.

Crest history

Titles
 Angolan League: 2
 1983, 1985
 Angola Cup: 3
 1982, 1983, 2007
 Angolan SuperCup: 1
 1985
 Angolan 2nd Division: 1
 2015

Recent seasons
EC Primeiro de Maio's season-by-season performance since 2011:

 PR = Preliminary round, 1R = First round, GS = Group stage, R32 = Round of 32, R16 = Round of 16, QF = Quarter-finals, SF = Semi-finals

League & Cup Positions

Performance in CAF competitions
 African Cup of Champions Clubs: 2 appearances
1984: Second Round
1986: First Round

CAF Confederation Cup: 1 appearance
2008 – First Round

CAF Cup: 2 appearances
1994 – Finalist
1995 – Second Round

CAF Cup Winners' Cup: 1 appearance
1983 – First Round

Players and staff

Players

Staff

Manager history and performance

  =  =  =  =  =  =  =  =  =

See also
 Girabola (2016)
 Gira Angola

External links
 Blog
 Facebook profile
 Girabola.com profile
 Zerozero.pt profile

References

Association football clubs established in 1955
Primeiro de Maio
Benguela
1955 establishments in Angola
Sports clubs in Angola